Ikpeshi is an Edoid language of Bendel State, Nigeria.

References

Edoid languages